Chrysostom Arangaden (1916—2004) was an Old Testament scholar and a member of the Society for Biblical Studies, India.  Arangaden was notable for his contribution as Associate General Secretary (Translation's) of the Bible Society of India.

Arangaden was an active administrator of the National Missionary Society of India and became Honorary Treasurer of the Society in 1949.

In 1960, Arangaden served as Distribution Promoter of the Bible Society of India for a short tenure and was also in charge of the Tamil Nadu Auxiliary of the Bible Society of India

Writings
 1947, Christian leadership: A new emphasis,
 1967, The New Testament in recent Scholarship,
 1985, With the Word at hand,
 1992 (with John Philipose), Carey's legacy of Bible translation

Studies
Arangaden studied at the United Theological College, Bangalore during 1940-1944 during the Principalship of M. H. Harrison for spiritual studies leading to B.D. under the Senate of Serampore College (University).  For postgraduate studies, Arangaden studied at the Princeton Theological Seminary, New Jersey where he took a Th.M.

Arangaden continued his studies at New Jersey enrolling for a Master of Arts programme in Sociology with the Drew University.

References

Further reading
 

20th-century Protestant religious leaders
Senate of Serampore College (University) alumni
Princeton Theological Seminary alumni
Drew University alumni
2004 deaths
Indian translation scholars
Translators of the Bible into English
Indian biblical scholars
Old Testament scholars
20th-century linguists
Place of birth missing
1916 births
20th-century translators